"Si El Amor Se Va" (English: If Love Goes Away) is a song written by  Roberto Livi and co-written by Bebu Silvetti and performed by Brazilian singer-songwriter Roberto Carlos. It was released as the second single from his studio album Volver (1988). The song became his first number-one single in the Billboard Hot Latin Tracks chart. 

"Si El Amor Se Va" debuted in the chart at number 29 on October 8, 1988, and climbed to the top ten two weeks later. It reached the top position of the chart on November 19, 1988, replacing "Boca Rosa" by Dominican singer Ángela Carrasco and being replaced three weeks later by Rocío Dúrcal's "Cómo Tu Mujer". "Si El Amor Se Va" ranked at number 12 in the Hot Latin Tracks Year-End Chart of 1989. Lucía Méndez and Banda La Piñera also recorded their version of the song.

Charts

1988 singles
1988 songs
Roberto Carlos (singer) songs
Spanish-language songs
Songs written by Roberto Livi
Songs written by Bebu Silvetti
CBS Discos singles
1980s ballads
Pop ballads